Oliver Twist, Jr. is a 1921 American silent drama film directed by Millard Webb and starring Harold Goodwin, Lillian Hall, George Nichols, Harold Esboldt, Scott McKee, Clarence Wilson, and G. Raymond Nye. It is based on the 1838 novel Oliver Twist by Charles Dickens. The film was released by Fox Film Corporation on March 13, 1921.

Plot
An orphan named Oliver Twist, Jr. meets a pickpocket on the streets of London. From there, he joins a group of thieves who are trained to steal for their master.

Cast
 Harold Goodwin as Oliver Twist, Jr.
 Lillian Hall as Ruth Norris
 George Nichols as Schoolmaster
 Harold Esboldt as Dick
 Scott McKee as Artful Dodger
 Clarence Wilson as Fagin
 G. Raymond Nye as Bill Sykes
 Hayward Mack as Monks
 Pearl Lowe as Mrs. Morris
 George Clair as James Harrison
 Fred Kirby as Judson
 Irene Hunt as Nancy

Preservation
A copy of Oliver Twist, Jr. exists in Cinemateket Svenska Filminstitutet, Stockholm.

References

External links
 
 
 
 

1921 drama films
Silent American drama films
1921 films
American silent feature films
American black-and-white films
Fox Film films
Films based on Oliver Twist
Films directed by Millard Webb
1920s American films